Muhammad Yasir bin Hanapi (born 21 June 1989) is a Singaporean professional footballer who plays as a right midfielder for Singapore Premier League club Tampines Rovers and the Singapore national team.

Yasir originally played as a right-back but was converted to a right winger when he played for LionsXII in 2012.

Club career

Geylang United 
Yasir started his career at Geylang United where he played from 2008 to 2012, before transferring to LionsXII.

Return to Geylang 
Thereafter, he left for Geylang International, played for Home United, before signing for Tampines Rovers.

Tampines Rovers 
After a successful season with Home United, Yasir moved to Tampines Rovers in 2016. He scored his first goal for the stags in his first league match for his new club but was sent off after receiving two yellow cards. In the 2017 S.League season, he made 16 appearances for the Stags in the league, scoring 5 goals in the process before leaving for PDRM.

PDRM FA 
On 9 June 2017, Yasir joined national teammate Safuwan Baharudin at Malaysian second-tier side PDRM for the remainder of the Malaysia Premier League season. It was reported that no transfer fee was involved in the deal. He opened his account for the cops in a 3–1 loss to Perlis.

Return to Tampines Rovers 
Following the conclusion of his contract with the Cops, Yasir rejoined former club Tampines Rovers for the 2018 S.League season.

Yasir started the 2021 Singapore Premier League in blistering form, netting 3 goals in 3 games to help his team sit joint top of the table after 3 games in the season.

International career
Yasir was part of the Singapore national under-23 team that took part in the 2007 Southeast Asian Games in Korat, Thailand that won a bronze medal. He was also part of the team which repeated their bronze medal success in Vientiane, Laos in 2009.

Yasir was called up to the senior team for the first time in May 2015 for a series of friendly games against Bangladesh and Brunei.

On 13 November 2016, Yasir scored his first international goal on his 12th international cap in Singapore's final warm up match for the 2016 AFF Championship. He came off the bench to score the winner against Cambodia national football team, giving Singapore a narrow 1–0 win over the regional minnows.

Others

Singapore Selection Squad
Yasir was selected as part of the Singapore Selection squad for The Sultan of Selangor's Cup to be held on 6 May 2017.

Career statistics

Club

International
Score and Result list Singapore's goal tally first

|-
| 1. || 13 November 2016 || Jalan Besar Stadium, Singapore ||  ||  ||  || Friendly ||
|}

Honours
Southeast Asian Games Bronze Medal: 2007, 2009

References

1989 births
Living people
Singaporean footballers
Singapore international footballers
Geylang International FC players
Home United FC players
Singapore Premier League players
LionsXII players
Association football midfielders
Singaporean people of Malay descent
Singaporean people of Javanese descent
Malaysia Super League players
Southeast Asian Games bronze medalists for Singapore
Southeast Asian Games medalists in football
Competitors at the 2007 Southeast Asian Games
Competitors at the 2009 Southeast Asian Games